Albert Girós (Barcelona, 1954) is a Catalan artist.

His first important exhibit was in 1982, when Girós work was exhibit at the Espai 10 space of the Fundació Joan Miró, under the name la solidificació de la llum. Since then, he has been working on several aspects of the sculpture.

References 

Spanish sculptors
Spanish male sculptors
People from Barcelona
Living people
Artists from Catalonia
1954 births
Date of birth missing (living people)